The 1978 season of the African Cup Winners' Cup football club tournament was won by Canon Yaoundé in two-legged final victory against Gor Mahia. This was the fifth season that the tournament took place for the winners of each African country's domestic cup. Twenty-eight sides entered the competition, with USCA Bangui, Al Ittihad El Iskandary, Al Nil Wad Medani withdrawing before 1st leg of the first round. No preliminary round took place during this season of the competition.

First round

|}

Second round

|}

Quarterfinals

|}

Semifinals

|}

Final

|}

External links
 Results available on CAF Official Website

African Cup Winners' Cup
2